The 1896 international cricket season was from April 1896 to September 1896.

Season overview

June

Australia in England

References

International cricket competitions by season
1896 in cricket